Kenneth Stanley "Bud" Adams, Jr. (January 3, 1923 – October 21, 2013) was an American businessman who was the founder and owner of the Tennessee Titans, a National Football League (NFL) franchise. A member of the Cherokee Nation who originally made his fortune in the petroleum business, Adams was chairman and CEO of Adams Resources & Energy Inc., a wholesale supplier of oil and natural gas. He was instrumental in the founding and establishment of the former American Football League (AFL). 

Adams became a charter AFL owner with the establishment of the current Titans franchise, which was originally known as the Houston Oilers. He was the senior owner (by time) with his team in the National Football League, a few months ahead of Buffalo Bills' owner Ralph Wilson. Adams also was one of the owners of the Houston Mavericks of the American Basketball Association (ABA) and the owner of the second Nashville Kats franchise of the Arena Football League (AFL).

Adams had many other business interests in the Houston area, including owning several Lincoln-Mercury automobile franchises.

Early life
Born in Bartlesville, Oklahoma on January 3, 1923, Adams was the son of K. S. "Boots" Adams and Blanch Keeler Adams. He became an enrolled member of the Cherokee Nation by virtue of his maternal line. Two of his great-grandmothers were Cherokee women who married European-American men: Nelson Carr and George B. Keeler, who played roles in trade and oil in early Oklahoma. Keeler drilled the first commercial oil well, near the Caney River.

Adams's father succeeded the founder Frank Phillips as president of Phillips Petroleum Company in 1939.  Adams's uncle William Wayne Keeler, CEO of Phillips Petroleum Company for years, was appointed Principal Chief of the Cherokee Nation by U.S. President Harry S. Truman in 1949 and served through 1971, when the Cherokee were allowed to hold their own elections. Keeler was then democratically elected and served until 1975.  Adams's ancestors include other prominent Cherokee leaders.

Adams graduated from Culver Military Academy in 1940 after lettering in three sports. After a brief stint at Menlo College, he transferred to the University of Kansas (KU), where he played briefly on the varsity football team as he completed an engineering degree. In his lone season on the Jayhawk football team, he was a teammate of politician Bob Dole.

Sports career in Houston

Early career in the American Football League
Adams soon became interested in owning an NFL team. In 1959, Adams and fellow Texas oilman Lamar Hunt tried to buy the struggling and insolvent Chicago Cardinals and move them to Texas.

The Houston Oilers and the Astrodome
Adams and the other AFL owners received a tremendous boost in credibility and net worth in 1966 with the merger of the AFL with and into the NFL. It was effective with the 1970 season. In 1968 Adams moved his team into the Astrodome, which since 1965 had been the home of the Houston Astros of baseball's National League (incidentally, Adams was one of the original part-owners of the team for the 1962 season)

Houston vs. Adams
By the mid-1990s, several NFL teams had new stadiums built largely or entirely with public funding, and several more deals had been agreed to. These new venues featured amenities such as "club seating" and other potential revenue streams that were not part of the NFL's default revenue-sharing arrangements. Due to this, Adams began to lobby Mayor Bob Lanier for a new stadium. However, Lanier turned down the request almost out of hand. Lanier knew that Houstonians were not willing to spend money for a brand-new stadium less than a decade after helping pay for heavily renovating the Astrodome.

Sports career in Tennessee

Tennessee Oilers
Despite the problems, Adams initially intended to stick it out. But, only one game, the finale against the Pittsburgh Steelers, attracted a larger crowd than could have been accommodated at Vanderbilt. Although 50,677 people showed up, the crowd appeared to be composed of at least half, and as many as three-fourths, Steeler fans.

Tennessee Titans

On November 15, 2009, Adams was caught on video displaying an obscene gesture towards the Buffalo bench after the Titans routed the Bills 41-14. Commissioner Roger Goodell, who happened to be attending the game, fined him $250,000. Afterwards, Adams remarked "Oh, I knew I was going to get in trouble for that. I was just so happy we won."

Personal life
Adams was an enrolled member of the Cherokee Nation. He had served on the executive committee of the Cherokee National Historical Society.

He attended River Oaks Baptist Church in Houston. He and his wife Nancy Neville Adams were married for 62 years, until her death in February 2009 at the age of 84.  They had two daughters, Susan and Amy, and a son, Kenneth S. Adams III, each of whom (and their children) are registered Cherokee. Their son died in June 1987 at the age of 29 from apparent suicide.

Death
Adams died of natural causes at his home in Houston at age 90 in 2013. His body was found in his River Oaks home after police were called for a welfare check.

At the time of his death, Adams's 409 wins were the most of any current NFL owner. He gained his 400th career victory in the 2011 season finale when his Titans defeated the team which replaced his Oilers in Houston, the Texans. His franchise made 21 playoff appearances in 53 seasons, eighth among NFL teams since 1960. In championship game appearances, his team reached the AFL Championship four times (1960-1962, 1967) and the AFC Championship Game four times (1978, 1979, 1999, 2002) with just one Super Bowl appearance (1999).

See also

 List of American Football League players

References

External links
 Tennessee Titans bio

1923 births
2013 deaths
Houston Mavericks coaches
Houston Oilers owners
Tennessee Titans owners
American Basketball Association executives
American Football League owners
Arena Football League executives
National Football League team presidents
University of Kansas alumni
United States Navy personnel of World War II
Basketball coaches from Texas
People from Bartlesville, Oklahoma
Businesspeople from Houston
Cherokee Nation sportspeople
Kansas Jayhawks football players
United States Navy officers
Culver Academies alumni
Sportspeople from Houston
20th-century American businesspeople
20th-century Native Americans
21st-century Native Americans